Differentiation may refer to:

Business
 Differentiation (economics), the process of making a product different from other similar products
 Product differentiation, in marketing
 Differentiated service, a service that varies with the identity of the consumer or the context in which the service is used

Science, technology, and mathematics

Biology and medicine
 Cellular differentiation, in biology
 Differentiation (journal), a peer-reviewed academic journal covering cell differentiation and cell development
 Developmental biology, the study of the process by which animals and plants grow and develop
 Differentiation therapy, a cancer treatment in which malignant cells are encouraged to differentiate into more mature forms using pharmacological agents

Geology
 Igneous differentiation, in geology
 Planetary differentiation, in planetary science and geology

Social sciences
 Differentiation (economics), the process of making a product different from other similar products
 Differentiation (ethnography), the invention of ostensible differences between cultures
 Differentiation (linguistics), in semantics, a meaning shift reached by "adding concepts to the original concepts"
 Differentiation (sociology), a feature of modern society, and way of dealing with complexity
 Differentiated instruction, in education
 Inductive reasoning aptitude, in psychology

Other uses in science, technology, and mathematics
 Differentiation (mathematics), the process of finding a derivative
 Differentiated security, a form of computer security that deploys different security policies and mechanisms according to the identity and context of a user or transaction

See also
 Difference (disambiguation)
 Different (disambiguation)
 Differentiation of measures (disambiguation)
 Differential (disambiguation)
 
 
 : includes undifferentiation and undifferentiated (mostly used in biological or medical terms)